A single territorial collectivity is a chartered subdivision of France that exercises the powers of both a region and a department. This subdivision was introduced in Mayotte in 2011, in French Guiana and Martinique in 2015, and in Corsica in 2018.

The nature of a French single territorial collectivity is set forth in Articles 72 and 73 of the French Constitution of 1958 (as amended since), which provides for local autonomy within limits prescribed by law.

See also 
 Administrative divisions of France

References

Overseas France